Elachista mannella is a moth of the family Elachistidae that is found in Austria.

References

mannella
Moths described in 1992
Endemic fauna of Austria
Moths of Europe